Tom Wasinger is an American audio engineer, record producer, and multi-instrumentalist based out of Boulder, Colorado, United States. He is most well known for his production work in indigenous music of North America, winning three Grammy awards and multiple independent awards for “Best Native American Music Album." Tom builds experimental musical instruments out of resonating stone, and is the founder of “The Lost Angel Stone Ensemble”, the world's only touring ensemble that performs with stone instruments. He is currently signed to independent record labels Silver Wave Records and Vohnic Music LLC.

Early life 
Tom moved to Colorado from his native Oklahoma in 1974 and lived in Fort Collins. In the 70s and 80s he fronted various rock bands touring regionally. In the late 80s Tom transitioned into the role of a producer and started the "Lost Angel Stone Ensemble" the world's first touring ensemble of resonating instruments.

1990s - 2010s 
Tom and his wife, Susan Wasinger, started a project in 1993 aimed at recording lullabies from around the world. The album is titled “The World Sings Goodnight” and sold tens of thousands of copies after being featured on NPR’s “All Things Considered.” In 1996 Tom scored a mountain biking film entitled Tread directed by Bill Snyder. He continued working on various projects and was nominated for his first Grammy in 2001 for his production work on Joanne Shenandoah's “Peacemaker’s Journey.” The Native American album did go on to receive an Independent Music Award and a Nammy Award. After receiving these awards Tom focused more on Native American and indigenous music projects. This led to “Beneath the Raven Moon”, an album with artist Mary Youngblood. The album did exceptionally well in its genre, winning a Grammy and multiple independent awards as well as charting on the Billboard charts. Tom's follow up project in 2005 with Mary Youngblood titled “Dance With the Wind” won another Grammy for production. He won his third Grammy in 2009 for “Come to Me Great Mystery: Native American Healing Songs” a compilation album released by Silver Wave Records.

2010s - present 
Tom works on various projects both in Native American music and other genres. He works from his studio outside Boulder, Colorado.

Discography

Awards 

|-
| 1997 || Joanne Shenandoah - Matriarch (as Producer) || Independent Music Award || 
|-
| 1999 || Various Artists - Under the Green Corn Moon (as Producer) || Notable Award || 
|-
| 1999 || Joanne Shenandoah & Lawrence Laughing - Orenda (as Producer) || Nammy Award  || 
|-
| 2000 || Mary Youngblood - Heart of the World (as Producer) || Independent Music Award || 
|-
| 2000 || Mary Youngblood - Heart of the World (as Producer) || Nammy Award  || 
|-
| 2000 || Mary Youngblood - Heart of the World (as Producer) || Amazon.com Award || 
|-
| 2000 || Mary Youngblood - Heart of the World (as Producer) || New Age Voice Award || 
|-
| 2001 || Joanne Shenandoah - Peacemaker's Journey (as Producer) || Independent Music Award || 
|-
| 2001 || Joanne Shenandoah - Peacemaker's Journey (as Producer) || Nammy Award  || 
|-
| 2001 || Joanne Shenandoah - Peacemaker's Journey (as Producer) || Grammy Award || 
|-
| 2003 || Mary Youngblood - Beneath the Raven Moon (as Producer) || Grammy Award || 
|-
| 2003 || Mary Youngblood - Beneath the Raven Moon (as Producer) || Independent Music Award || 
|-
| 2005 || Mary Youngblood - Feed the Fire (as Producer) || Nammy Award  || 
|-
| 2007 || Mary Youngblood - Dance With the Wind (as Producer) || Grammy Award || 
|-
| 2009 || Various Artists - Come to Me Great Mystery (as Producer) || Grammy Award || 
|-
| 2009 || Kevin Locke - Earth Gift (as Producer) || Nammy Award ||

References

Year of birth missing (living people)
Living people
American audio engineers
Record producers from Colorado